César Gabriel Florentín (born 13 March 1999) is an Argentine professional footballer who plays as an attacking midfielder for Russian club FC Orenburg.

Career
Florentín came through the youth system of River Plate, prior to signing for Argentinos Juniors' ranks in 2016; making the breakthrough into the latter's first-team fold in 2019. He was initially an unused substitute four times in the Copa Sudamericana, across ties with Deportes Tolima and Colón. Florentín's professional debut arrived on 3 August 2019 versus Aldosivi, as he came off the bench to replace Nicolás Silva after seventy-three minutes of a goalless away draw. Eight more appearances came in 2019–20, which included his first start arriving in a Copa Sudamericana first stage tie with Sport Huancayo on 11 February 2020.

On 8 March 2021, Florentín scored for the first time as he netted a stoppage time winner away to ex-club River Plate in the Copa de la Liga Profesional.

On 2 August 2022, Florentín signed with Russian Premier League club FC Orenburg, where he joined his compatriots Braian Mansilla and Lucas Vera.

Personal life
On 25 July 2020, Florentín tested positive for COVID-19 amid the pandemic; becoming the first Primera División player to do so.

Career statistics
.

Notes

References

1999 births
People from La Matanza Partido
Sportspeople from Buenos Aires Province
Argentine sportspeople of Paraguayan descent
Living people
Argentine footballers
Association football midfielders
Argentinos Juniors footballers
FC Orenburg players
Argentine Primera División players
Russian Premier League players
Argentine expatriate footballers
Expatriate footballers in Russia
Argentine expatriate sportspeople in Russia